The AACTA Award for Best Costume Design is an accolade given by the Australian Academy of Cinema and Television Arts (AACTA), a non-profit organisation whose aim is to "identify, award, promote and celebrate Australia's greatest achievements in film and television." The award is handed out at the annual AACTA Awards, which rewards achievements in feature film, television, documentaries and short films. From 1977 to 2010, the category was presented by the Australian Film Institute (AFI), the Academy's parent organisation, at the annual Australian Film Institute Awards (known as the AFI Awards). When the AFI launched the Academy in 2011, it changed the annual ceremony to the AACTA Awards, with the current prize being a continuum of the AFI Award for Best Costume Design. Terry Ryan has received the most awards in this category with five.

Winners and nominees
In the following table, the years listed correspond to the year of film release; the ceremonies are usually held the same year. The costume designer whose name is in yellow background have won the award. Those that are neither highlighted nor in bold are the nominees. When sorted chronologically, the table always lists the winning costume designer first and then the other nominees.

{| class="sortable wikitable" width="60%" border="1" cellpadding="5" cellspacing="0" align="centre"
|- bgcolor="#bebebe"
! width="5%" | Year
! width="19%" | Costume designer(s)
! width="19%" | Film
|-
| colspan="4" style="background:#FFDEAD;" align="center"| AFI Awards
|-
| colspan="4" style="background:#CCCCCC;" align="center"| 1970s
|-  
|rowspan="5" align="center" | 1977(19th)
|- style="background:#FAEB86"
| Judith Dorsman
| The Picture Show Man
|-
| Helen Dyson
| Storm Boy
|-
| Robbie Perkins
| Oz
|-
| Ron Williams
| Let the Balloon Go
|-
|rowspan="5" align="center" | 1978(20th)
|-  style="background:#FAEB86"
| Norma Moriceau
| Newsfront
|-
| Bruce Finlayson
| The Chant of Jimmie Blacksmith
|-
| Patricia Forster
| The Mango Tree
|-
| Anna Senior
| The Getting of Wisdom
|-
|rowspan="5" align="center" | 1979(21st)
|-  style="background:#FAEB86"
| Anna Senior
| My Brilliant Career
|-
| Luciana Arrighi
| The Night the Prowler
|-
| Clare Griffin
| Mad Max
|-
| Kevin Regan
| The Last of the Knucklemen
|-
| colspan="4" style="background:#CCCCCC;" align="center"| 1980s
|-
|rowspan="5" align="center" | 1980(22nd)
|-  style="background:#FAEB86"
| Anna Senior
| Breaker Morant
|-
| Norma Moriceau
| The Chain Reaction
|-
| Graham Purcell
| Manganinnie
|-
| Terry Ryan
| Harlequin
|-
|rowspan="5" align="center" | 1981(23rd)
|-  style="background:#FAEB86"
| Norma Moriceau
| Fatty Finn
|-
| Ruth De la Lande
| The Club
|-
| Ross Major
| Hoodwink
|-
| Terry Ryan and Wendy Weir
| Gallipoli
|-
|rowspan="5" align="center" | 1982(24th)
|-  style="background:#FAEB86"
| Norma Moriceau
| Mad Max 2
|-
| Luciana Arrighi and Terry Ryan
| Starstruck
|-
| Aphrodite Kondos
| The Pirate Movie
|-
| Camilla Rountree
| We of the Never Never
|-
|rowspan="5" align="center" | 1983(25th)
|-  style="background:#FAEB86"
| Bruce Finlayson
| Careful, He Might Hear You
|-
| Kristian Fredrikson
| Undercover
|-
| Terry Ryan
| The Year of Living Dangerously
|-
| Anna Senior
| Phar Lap
|-
|rowspan="5" align="center" | 1984(26th)
|-  style="background:#FAEB86"
| Jan Hurley
| Silver City
|-
| Ross Major
| One Night Stand
|-
| Norma Moriceau
| Street Hero
|-
| Jennie Tate
| Strikebound
|-
|rowspan="5" align="center" | 1985(27th)
|-  style="background:#FAEB86"
| Roger Kirk
| Rebel
|-
| Helen Hooper
| Bliss
|-
| Ross Major
| The Boy Who Had Everything
|-
| Terry Ryan
| The Coca-Cola Kid
|-
|rowspan="5" align="center" | 1986(28th)
|-  style="background:#FAEB86"
| Terry Ryan
| Kangaroo
|-
| George Liddle
| Burke & Wills
|-
| George Liddle
| Playing Beatie Bow
|-
| Jennie Tate
| For Love Alone
|-
|rowspan="5" align="center" | 1987(29th)
|-  style="background:#FAEB86"
| Steve Dobson
| The Umbrella Woman
|-
| Roger Ford
| Those Dear Departed (Ghosts CAN Do It)
|-
| George Liddle
| Bullseye
|-
| Jennie Tate
| The Place at the Coast
|-
|rowspan="5" align="center" | 1988(30th)
|-  style="background:#FAEB86"
| Glenys Jackson
| The Navigator: A Medieval Odyssey
|-
| Jeanie Cameron
| Mull
|-
| Cheryl McCloud
| Boulevard of Broken Dreams
|-
| Angela Tonks and Mathu Anderson
| Spirits of the Air, Gremlins of the Clouds
|-
|rowspan="5" align="center" | 1989(31st)
|-  style="background:#FAEB86"
| Rose Chong
| What the Moon Saw 
|-
| Gary L. Keady, Nicholas Huxley and Nicola Braithwaite
| Sons of Steel
|-
| Karen Everett
| Ghosts... of the Civil Dead
|-
| Aphrodite Kondos
| Georgia
|-
| colspan="4" style="background:#CCCCCC;" align="center"| 1990s
|-
|rowspan="5" align="center" | 1990(32nd)
|-  style="background:#FAEB86"
| Roger Kirk
| Blood Oath
|-
| Aphrodite Kondos
| Hunting
|-
| Michelle Leonard
| Two Brothers Running
|-
| Michelle Leonard
| Weekend with Kate
|-
|rowspan="5" align="center" | 1991(33rd)
|-  style="background:#FAEB86"
| Tess Schofield
| Spotswood
|-
| Mic Cheminal
| Isabelle Eberhardt
|-
| Murray Picknett
| Waiting
|-
| Jennie Tate
| Aya
|-
|rowspan="5" align="center" | 1992(34th)
|-  style="background:#FAEB86"
| Angus Strathie
| Strictly Ballroom
|-
| Renée April and John Hay
| Black Robe
|-
| Anna Borghesi
| Romper Stomper
|-
| Clarissa Patterson
| Love in Limbo
|-
|rowspan="6" align="center" | 1993(35th)
|-  style="background:#FAEB86"
| Janet Patterson
| The Piano
|-
| Roger Ford
| The Nostradamus Kid
|-
| Aphrodite Kondos
| Gross Misconduct
|-
| Lynn-Maree Milburn and Jacqui Everitt
| Say a Little Prayer
|-
| Fiona Spence
| Frauds
|-
|rowspan="5" align="center" | 1994(36th)
|-  style="background:#FAEB86"
| Lizzy Gardiner and Tim Chappel
| The Adventures of Priscilla, Queen of the Desert
|-
| Anna Borghesi
| Body Melt
|-
| Wendy Chuck
| Country Life
|-
| Terry Ryan
| Muriel's Wedding
|-
|rowspan="5" align="center" | 1995(37th)
|-  style="background:#FAEB86"
| Terry Ryan
| Billy's Holiday
|-
| Anna Borghesi
| Metal Skin
|-
| Vicki Friedman
| That Eye, the Sky
|-
| George Liddle
| Mushrooms
|-
|rowspan="5" align="center" | 1996(38th)
|-  style="background:#FAEB86"
| Terry Ryan
| Children of the Revolution
|-
| Anna Borghesi
| Love Serenade
|-
| Tess Schofield
| Mr. Reliable
|-
| Louise Wakefield
| Shine
|-
|rowspan="5" align="center" | 1997(39th)
|-  style="background:#FAEB86"
| Louise Wakefield
| Doing Time for Patsy Cline
|-
| Ruth De la Lande
| Kiss or Kill
|-
| Edie Kurzer
| Thank God He Met Lizzie
|-
| Anna Borghesi
| The Well
|-
|rowspan="5" align="center" | 1998(40th)
|-  style="background:#FAEB86"
| Janet Patterson
| Oscar and Lucinda
|-
| Anna Borghesi
| Head On
|-
| Annie Marshall
| The Boys
|-
| Aphrodite Kondos
| The Sound of One Hand Clapping
|-
|rowspan="5" align="center" | 1999(41st)
|-  style="background:#FAEB86"
| Terry Ryan
| Passion
|-
| Edie Kurzer
| In a Savage Land
|-
| rowspan="2"|Emily Seresin
| Praise
|-
| Two Hands
|-
| colspan="4" style="background:#CCCCCC;" align="center"| 2000s
|-
|rowspan="5" align="center" | 2000(42nd)
|-  style="background:#FAEB86"
| Tess Schofield
| Bootmen
|-
| Emma Hamilton Lewis
| 15 Amore
|-
| Paul Warren
| The Wog Boy
|-
| Louise Wakefield
| Walk the Talk
|-
|rowspan="5" align="center" | 2001(43rd)
|-  style="background:#FAEB86"
| Catherine Martin and Angus Strathie
| Moulin Rouge!
|-
| rowspan="2"| Margot Wilson
| La Spagnola
|-
| Lantana
|-
| Annie Marshall
| The Bank
|-
|rowspan="5" align="center" | 2002(44th)
|-  style="background:#FAEB86"
| Tess Schofield
| Dirty Deeds
|-
| Roger Ford
| Rabbit-Proof Fence
|-
| Angus Strathie
| Swimming Upstream
|-
| George Liddle
| WillFull
|-
|rowspan="5" align="center" | 2003(45th)
|-  style="background:#FAEB86"
| Anna Borghesi
| Ned Kelly
|-
| Annie Marshall
| Black and White
|-
| Jackline Sassine
| Gettin' Square
|-
| Emily Seresin
| The Night We Called It a Day
|-
|rowspan="5" align="center" | 2004(46th)
|-  style="background:#FAEB86"
| Emily Seresin
| Somersault
|-
| Anna Borghesi
| Love's Brother
|-
| Katie Graham
| One Perfect Day
|-
| Jill Johanson
| Tom White
|-
|rowspan="5" align="center" | 2005(47th)
|-  style="background:#FAEB86"
| Margot Wilson
| The Proposition
|-
| Paul Warren
| Hating Alison Ashley
|-
| Melinda Doring
| Little Fish
|-
| Edie Kurzer
| Look Both Ways
|-
|rowspan="5" align="center" | 2006(48th)
|-  style="background:#FAEB86"
| Jane Johnston
| Macbeth
|-
| Anna Borghesi
| The Book of Revelation
|-
| Melinda Doring
| Suburban Mayhem
|-
| Phill Eagles
| Kokoda
|-
|rowspan="5" align="center" | 2007(49th)
|-  style="background:#FAEB86"
| Cappi Ireland
| The Home Song Stories
|-
| Jodie Fried
| Romulus, My Father
|-
| Emily Seresin
| Clubland
|-
| Ariane Weiss
| Razzle Dazzle: A Journey into Dance
|-
|rowspan="5" align="center" | 2008(50th)
|-  style="background:#FAEB86"
| Cappi Ireland
| The Tender Hook
|-
| Shareen Beringer
| Hey, Hey, It's Esther Blueburger
|-
| Susannah Buxton
| Death Defying Acts
|-
| Wenyan Gao and Kym Barrett
| The Children of Huang Shi
|-
|rowspan="5" align="center" | 2009(51st)
|-  style="background:#FAEB86"
| Catherine Martin and Eliza Godman
| Australia
|-
| Anna Borghesi
| Mao's Last Dancer
|-
| Cappi Ireland
| Balibo
|-
| Mariot Kerr
| Lucky Country
|-
| colspan="4" style="background:#CCCCCC;" align="center"| 2010s
|-
|rowspan="5" align="center" | 2010(52nd)
|-  style="background:#FAEB86"
| Janet Patterson
| Bright Star
|-
| Cappi Ireland
| Animal Kingdom
|-
| Ian Sparke and Wendy Cork
| Beneath Hill 60
|-
| Margot Wilson
| Bran Nue Dae
|-
| colspan="4" style="background:#FFDEAD;" align="center"| AACTA Awards
|-
|rowspan="5" align="center" | 2011(1st)
|-  style="background:#FAEB86"
| Terry Ryan
| The Eye of the Storm
|-
| Shareen Beringer
| Sleeping Beauty
|-
| Cappi Ireland
| Oranges and Sunshine
|-
| Emily Seresin
| The Hunter
|-
|rowspan="5" align="center" | 2012(2nd)
|-  style="background:#FAEB86"
| Tess Schofield
| The Sapphires
|-
| Stefanie Bieker
| Lore
|-
| Tim Chappel
| Mental
|-
| Lizzy Gardiner
| Burning Man
|-
|rowspan="5" align="center" | 2013(3rd)
|-  style="background:#FAEB86"
| Catherine Martin, Silvana Azzi Heras and Kerry Thompson|The Great Gatsby|-
| Shareen Beringer
|Goddess  
|-
| Joanna Mae Park
|Adoration
|-
| Woranun Pueakpun and Sylvia Wilczynski
|The Rocket
|-
|rowspan=5 align="center" |2014(4th)
|-  style="background:#FAEB86"
| Tess Schofield| The Water Diviner|-
| Wendy Cork
| Predestination
|-
| Lizzy Gardiner
| The Railway Man
|-
| Mariot Kerr
| Tracks
|-
|rowspan=5 align="center" |2015(5th)
|-  style="background:#FAEB86"
| Marion Boyce and Margot Wilson| The Dressmaker|-
| Cappi Ireland
| Cut Snake
|-
| Jenny Beavan
| Mad Max: Fury Road
|-
| Maria Pattison and Sarah Cyngler
| Partisan
|-
|rowspan=5 align="center" |2016(6th)
|-  style="background:#FAEB86"
| Jonathon Oxlade| Girl Asleep|-
| Liz Palmer
| Gods of Egypt
|-
| Lizzy Gardiner
| Hacksaw Ridge
|-
| Jennifer Irwin
| Spear
|-
|rowspan=5 align="center" |2017(7th)
|-  style="background:#FAEB86"
| Cappi Ireland| Lion|-
| Maria Pattison
| Berlin Syndrome
|-
| Tess Schofield
| Dance Academy: The Movie
|-
| Margot Wilson
| Jasper Jones
|-
|rowspan=5 align="center" |2018(8th)
|-  style="background:#FAEB86"
|Wendy Cork|Ladies in Black|-
|Jacqueline Durran
|Mary Magdalene
|-
|Heather Wallace
|Sweet Country
|-
|Wendy Cork
|Winchester
|-
|rowspan=5 align="center" |2019(9th)
|-  style="background:#FAEB86"
|Jane Petrie|The King|-
|Anna Borghesi
|Hotel Mumbai
|-
|Edie Kurzer
|Judy and Punch
|-
|Margot Wilson
|The Nightingale
|-
| colspan="4" style="background:#CCCCCC;" align="center"| 2010s|-
|rowspan="6" align="center" | 2020(10th)
|-  style="background:#FAEB86"
| Alice Babidge| True History of the Kelly Gang|-
| Terri Lamera
| H is for Happiness
|-
| Emily Seresin
| I Am Woman
|-
| Zohie Castellano, Olivia Simpson
| Measure for Measure
|-
| Nina Edwards
| Standing Up for Sunny
|-
|rowspan="6" align="center" | 2021(11th)
|-  style="background:#FAEB86"
| Erin Roche| High Ground|-
| Cappi Ireland
| The Dry
|-
| Cappi Ireland
| Mortal Kombat
|-
| Alice Babidge
| Nitram
|-
| Tess Schofield
| Rams
|-
|}

Further reading
 

NotesA''': From 1958-2010, the awards were held during the year of the films release. However, from 2012, onwards, awards are handed out for films of the previous year.

References

External links
 Official website of the Australian Academy of Cinema and Television Arts

Costume design
Awards for film costume design
Lists of films by award
Awards established in 1977
1977 establishments in Australia